Kalari is a 2018 Tamil-language action thriller film directed by Kiran and produced by Senith Keloth under the Nakshathra Movie Magic banner. The film stars Krishna, Vidya Pradeep, and Samyuktha Menon in the lead roles, while M. S. Bhaskar and Jayaprakash play pivotal roles. The soundtrack and background score were composed by V. Prasanna, while the cinematography and editing were done by R. B. Gurudev and Sathyaraj Natarajan respectively. The film was released on 24 August 2018.

Cast
Krishna as Murugesan 
Vidya Pradeep as Mallika
Samyuktha as Thenmozhi
M. S. Bhaskar as Maari
Jayaprakash as Siddique Bhai
Vishnu as Anwar
Pandi as Murugesan's friend
Sendrayan as Peter

Production
Directed by debutant Kiran, the film is set in Vathuruthy in Kochi and tells the tale of a strained father-son relationship. Krishna was signed to portray a man with agoraphobia who wants to lead a peaceful life, while his abusive father, essayed by M. S. Bhaskar, was characterised as a rogue who lives life at his own will. Vidya Pradeep was selected to play Krishna's pair, while Samyuktha Menon was signed to debut as Krishna's sister. R. B. Gurudev handled the film's cinematography, while playback singer V. Prasanna turned music composer with this film. Kiran had filmed the project in Vathuruthy owing to its large Tamil population and its proximity to a railway track, which features throughout the film. In regard to the title, Krishna noted the film has nothing to do with kalaripayattu, the art form. He stated that "kalari" in Tamil means war, and the film dealt with the internal and external wars of his character in the film.

The shoot of the film began in January 2017 and continued throughout the year.

Release
The Times of India gave the film two out of five stars and wrote that "Kalari is let down by the dated treatment. Neither the script nor the filmmaking feels fresh."

Track listing 
 Kedaya - Vaishali Samant, Prassanna
 Sokkali - Velmurugan, Mahalingam
 Yaaradhu - Hariharan, M. M. Monisha

References 

2018 films
2010s Tamil-language films
Indian action thriller films
2018 action thriller films